Epping railway station is a railway station in Epping, in the northern region of Sydney. It is served by Sydney Trains T9 Northern Line, NSW TrainLink Central Coast & Newcastle Line, and Metro North West Line services.

History
The station opened as Field of Mars on 17 September 1886. It was renamed Carlingford on 5 April 1887, and again to Epping on 7 October 1899 when it moved to its current site.

After much campaigning from locals, a wooden overhead booking office was constructed along with an additional island platform in 1928, The centre track was originally a terminating road, and was served by platforms on each side. This was intended as part of John Bradfield's proposed Epping to St Leonards line. A new booking office on the footbridge was added in 1967 after the 1928 wooden structure was destroyed by fire.

In the mid 1980s, the concourse was extended with more shade provided over platforms as well as the addition of two clock towers.

In 1979, the centre terminating track was converted to a bi-directional main line with the platform face on the eastern side fenced off. As part of the 2000s upgrading works, the fencing was switched to the opposite platform.

Upgrade works began in 2004 to prepare the station for the Epping to Chatswood rail link. Works included a new concourse and pedestrian overpass, wider platforms, an underground transfer concourse and the addition of two underground platforms (5 & 6) for the new line. The new aerial concourse was constructed to the north of the 1967 concourse, which was demolished. The above ground upgrades were completed on 14 April 2007, while the underground concourse and platforms were opened on 23 February 2009 in conjunction with the new line.

To the north of the station, an additional track was laid as part of the Northern Sydney Freight Corridor project opening in June 2016. The new track opened on 14 June 2016.

In September 2018, the Epping to Chatswood rail link (ECRL), the underground concourse and platforms 5 & 6 were closed and upgraded to metro standards, including fitting the underground platforms with platform screen doors, as part of the Sydney Metro Northwest project. As a result, the Northern line reverted to operating from Hornsby to Central via Strathfield, and was later designated its own route T9 in April 2019. On 26 May 2019, the underground concourse and platforms reopened and serviced the new Metro North West Line, operating between Chatswood and Tallawong. The tunnels from the ECRL to the surface was kept, however the track for the Up line was lifted. The track for the down line was kept in case access to the Sydney Metro tunnels was required by maintenance vehicles. However, this access has never been used, with the points clipped and several stop blocks (a piece of wood bolted across the rails) and buffer stops in the way.

Signal box
Epping signal box opened on 31 October 1928 and operated the interlocking at Epping until its closure on 12 November 2006. The original miniature lever frame was replaced by an NX panel circa 1980. Control of the area was transferred to Strathfield signal box, and then to the new Homebush Control Centre in October 2008. The signal box remained derelict and unused until its demolition in 2010. In 2019, control of the area was passed to the Rail Operations Centre in Alexandria.

Services

Epping station is served by bus routes operated by Busways and Hillsbus, and one NightRide route.

Trackplan

Gallery

References

External links

Epping station details Transport for New South Wales

Easy Access railway stations in Sydney
Epping, New South Wales
Sydney Metro stations
Railway stations in Australia opened in 1886
Railway stations in Australia opened in 1899
Main North railway line, New South Wales